Peter George Wood (September 1951 – 26 January 2022) was an English first-class cricketer active in 1981 who played for Nottinghamshire.

He was active in the Lancashire League and was the all-time leading run-maker for Rawtenstall.

Wood died suddenly in Australia on 26 January 2022, at the age of 70.

References

1951 births
2022 deaths
Cumberland cricketers
English cricketers
Nottinghamshire cricketers